Abdallah Mohamad Fadel Aich (born 5 October 1995) is a Lebanese footballer who plays as a left-back for  club Ansar.

Club career 
Aich started his career at Mawadda Tripoli, before moving to Nejmeh's youth team. He made his Lebanese Premier League debut on 6 May 2013, in a 2–1 loss against Safa. In 2015, Aich moved to Eintracht Nordhorn in Germany, playing 25 games and scoring four.

He then returned to Nejmeh in 2016, before being loaned out to Egtmaaey for one year the same year. Upon returning from loan, Aich was sold Tripoli in 2017. Having made 33 appearances in two seasons, he returned to Nejmeh in 2019.

In July 2022, Aich joined cross-city rivals Ansar on a free transfer.

International career 
Aich was called up by Lebanon U20 for the 2013 Jeux de la Francophonie. He made his senior debut for Lebanon on 10 October 2019, playing the full 90 minutes in a 2–1 home win against Turkmenistan in the 2022 FIFA World Cup qualifiers.

Career statistics

International

Honours
Nejmeh
 Lebanese FA Cup: 2021–22; runner-up: 2020–21
 Lebanese Elite Cup: 2021
 Lebanese Super Cup runner-up: 2021

References

External links

 
 
 
 
 

1995 births
Living people
Sportspeople from Tripoli, Lebanon
Lebanese footballers
Association football fullbacks
Nejmeh SC players
Eintracht Nordhorn players
Al Egtmaaey SC players
AC Tripoli players
Al Ansar FC players
Lebanese Premier League players
Lebanon youth international footballers
Lebanon international footballers
Lebanese expatriate footballers
Lebanese expatriate sportspeople in Germany
Expatriate footballers in Germany